Peter Boyers (born September 30, 1962) is a former member of the National Parliament of the Solomon Islands. He represented the Vona Vona constituency in Western Province. He lost his seat in the 2010 national election. He was Minister of Finance of the Solomon Islands from 2005 to 2006.

He founded the Kadere Party in 2014.

References

1962 births
Living people
Finance Ministers of the Solomon Islands
Members of the National Parliament of the Solomon Islands
People from the Western Province (Solomon Islands)

Political party founders